Christopher Olusola Oretan (born 8 September 1980 in Nigeria) is a Nigerian retired footballer.

Career

In 1998, Oretan signed for Naxxar Lions in Malta before joining another Maltese club, Valletta, where he stayed from 2000 to 2003.

For 2003/04, he signed for Croatian top flight side NK Slaven Belupo, but soon left due to a dispute with the head coach. From there, Oretan joined Doxa Dramas in Greece. However, he later had to leave because they were going bankrupt.

For the second half of 2004/05, he returned to Malta with Valletta.

After that, Oretan played for German lower league teams BV Cloppenburg, Bad Kötzting, TSV Großhadern, and SV Heimstetten.

References

External links
 

Nigerian footballers
Association football midfielders
Association football forwards
Living people
1980 births